Anton Führer (30 September 1854 – 20 July 1929). was a German classicist who specialised in the language of Boeotia in Ancient Greece. He completed his dissertation De dialecto Boeotica at the University of Göttingen in 1876.  As noted by Harry Falk (Indologist), he is not to be confused with Alois Anton Führer, the Indologist who studied Sanskrit at the University of Würzburg and had a controversial career in India. 
He was named an honorary citizen of the city of Rheine, and wrote a book about the city's history.

Personal life
He was a father of eight, three of his sons died in World War I.

Works
 Geschichte der Stadt Rheine. Von den ältesten Zeiten bis zur Gegenwart. A. Rieke Nachf., Rheine 1927 (Neuauflage 1974, Verlag der Buchhandlung Eckers)
Kurze Geschichte der Stadt Rheine. Aschendorff, Münster 1917
Geschichte des Gymnasiums Dionysianum in Rheine. A. Rieke, Rheine 1909

Works listed in the DNB

1
Geschichte der Stadt Rheine
Führer, Anton. - Rheine : Eckers, 1974, 2. Aufl.

2
Geschichte der Stadt Rheine
Führer, Anton. - Rheine i. W. : A. Rieke Nachf., 1927

3
Abriss der deutschen Grammatik
Führer, Anton. - Münster i. W. : Aschendorff, 1918, 3. Aufl.

4
Kurze Geschichte der Stadt Rheine
Führer, Anton. - Rheine : Aschendorff, Münster i. W., 1917

5
Sprachgeschichtliche Erläuterungen zur lateinischen Formen- u. Lautlehre
Führer, Anton. - Paderb. : Schöningh, 1917

6
Sprachwissenschaft und lateinische Schulgrammatik
Führer, Anton. - Paderborn : Schöningh, 1917

7
Geschichte des Gymnasiums Dionysianum in Rheine
Führer, Anton. - Rheine : A. Rieke, 1909

8
Deutsches Lesebuch für die unteren und mittleren Klassen höherer Lehranstalten
Führer, Anton. - Münster : Aschendorff

9
Uebungsstoff für ... des lateinischen Unterrichts
Führer, Anton. - Paderborn : Schöningh

10
Übungsstoff für die Mittelstufe des lateinischen Unterrichts
Führer, Anton. - Paderborn : F. Schöningh

11
Übungsstoffe für den lateinischen Unterricht
Schultz, Ferdinand. - Paderborn : Ferd. Schöningh

12
Vorschule für den ersten Unterricht im Lateinischen
Führer, Anton. - Paderborn : Schöningh

References

 

German classical scholars
German philologists
Hellenists
University of Göttingen alumni
1854 births
1929 deaths